Bethanie Mattek-Sands and Lucie Šafářová were the defending champions, but neither player could participate this year due to injury.

Chan Yung-jan and Martina Hingis won the title, defeating Shuko Aoyama and Yang Zhaoxuan in the final, 7–6(7–5), 3–6, [10–4].

As a result of Šafářová's withdrawal, Hingis regained the WTA no. 1 doubles ranking at the conclusion of the tournament.

Seeds
The top four seeds received a bye into the second round.

Draw

Finals

Top half

Bottom half

References 
 Main draw

Doubles